The Cotillion Stakes is an American Thoroughbred horse race held annually at Parx Racing and Casino in Bensalem, Pennsylvania. It is run in late September or early October as a prelude to the annual Breeders' Cup World Thoroughbred Championships. The race is open to three-year-old filles, willing to race one and one-sixteenth miles (eight and a half furlongs) on the dirt. The Grade I event carries a purse of US$1 million.

From 2006 to 2010 it was called the Fitz Dixon Cotillion to honor Fitz Eugene Dixon Jr. of the prominent Widener family of Philadelphia, who have been major figures in Thoroughbred racing since the early part of the 20th century.

This race, which was inaugurated in 1969 at Liberty Bell Park in Northeast Philadelphia before thoroughbred racing moved to the then-Keystone Racetrack (later known as Philadelphia Park) in nearby Bensalem in Bucks County, Pennsylvania, has produced multiple Eclipse Award winners including Shuvee, Susan's Girl, Revidere, Ashado, Havre de Grace, and Untapable. There Was No Running In 2020.

Records
Speed  record:
 1:40.93 – Havre de Grace (2010)

Most wins by a jockey:
 4 – Mike E. Smith (2000, 2013, 2016, 2018)

Most wins by a trainer:
 5 – Steven M. Asmussen (2012, 2014, 2018, 2021, 2022)

Most wins by an owner:
 3 – Fox Hill Farms (2000, 2010, 2016)

Winners

† In 1987, Sacahuista won the race but was disqualified for interference and set back to second.

† In 2018, Monomoy Girl won the race but was disqualified for interference and set back to second.

References

 The Cotillion Handicap at Pedigree Query
 The Cotillion Handicap at the NTRA
 The Cotillion Handicap at Philadelphia Park
 Bloodhorse article on Bear Now setting new record time in the 2007 Cotillion Handicap

Graded stakes races in the United States
Mile category horse races for fillies and mares
Horse races in Pennsylvania
Recurring sporting events established in 1969
Parx Casino and Racing
Widener family
Flat horse races for three-year-old fillies
1969 establishments in Pennsylvania